The Maltese people are an ethnic group native to Malta who speak Maltese, a Semitic language and share a common culture and Maltese history. Malta, an island country in the Mediterranean Sea, is an archipelago that also includes the islands of Gozo and Comino; people of Gozo, Gozitans are considered a subgroup of the Maltese.

History

The current Maltese people, characterised by the use of the Maltese language and by Roman Catholicism, are the descendants – through much mixing and hybridisation – of colonists from Sicily and Calabria who repopulated the Maltese islands in the beginning of the second millennium after a two-century lapse of depopulation that followed the Ifriqiyian conquest by the Aghlabids in AD 870.
A genetic study by Capelli et al. indicates that Malta was barely inhabited at the turn of the tenth century and was likely to have been repopulated by settlers from Sicily and Calabria who spoke Siculo-Arabic.
Previous inhabitants of the islands – Phoenicians, Romans, Byzantines – did not leave many traces, as most nameplaces were lost and replaced. 
The Normans conquered the island in 1091 and completely re-Christianised them by 1249. This re-Christianisation created the conditions for the evolution of the Maltese language from the now extinct Siculo-Arabic dialect.

The influences on the population after this have been fiercely debated among historians and geneticists. The origins question is complicated by numerous factors, including Malta's turbulent history of invasions and conquests, with long periods of depopulation followed by periods of immigration to Malta and intermarriage with the Maltese by foreigners from the Mediterranean, Western and Southern European countries that ruled Malta. The many demographic influences on the island include:
 The exile to Malta of the entire male population of the town of Celano (Italy) in 1223
 The removal of all remaining North African Muslims from Malta in 1224
 The stationing of Swabian and Sicilian Italian troops on Malta in 1240
 Further waves of European repopulation throughout the 13th century
 The arrival of several thousands Aragonese (i.e. Catalans, Valencians, Majorcans, and proper Aragonese, from current Spain) soldiers in 1283 to 1425.
 The settlement in Malta of noble families from Sicily (Italy) and the Crown of Aragon (now mostly part of Spain) between 1372 and 1450
 The arrival of several thousand Greek Rhodian sailors, soldiers, and slaves with the Knights of St. John in 1530
 The introduction of several thousand Sicilian laborers in 1551 and again in 1566
 The emigration of some 891 Italian exiles to Malta during the Risorgimento in 1849
 The posting of some 22,000 British servicemen in Malta from 1807 to 1979 (only a small number of whom remained in the islands), as well as other British and Irish who settled in Malta over the decades
 The mass emigration occurring after World War II and well into the 1960s and 70s. Many Maltese left the island for the United Kingdom, Australia, Canada and the USA. Following Malta's accession to the EU in 2004 expatriate communities grew in European countries such as the one in Belgium.

Over time, the various rulers of Malta published their own view of the ethnicity of the population. The Knights of Malta downplayed the role of Islam in Malta and promoted the idea of a continuous Roman Catholic presence.

Genetics

Y-DNA haplogroups are found at the following frequencies in Malta: R1  (35.55% including 32.2% R1b), J (28.90% including 21.10% J2 and 7.8% J1), I (12.20%), E (11.10% including 8.9% E1b1b), F (6.70%), K (4.40%), P (1.10%). Haplogroup R1 and I are typical in European populations and E, K, F and J haplogroups consist of lineages with differential distribution mostly in the Middle East and North Africa. The study by Capelli et al. has concluded that the contemporary males of Malta most likely originated from Southern Italy. The study also indicates that Malta was barely inhabited at the turn of the tenth century and was likely to have been repopulated by settlers from Sicily and Calabria who spoke Siculo-Arabic. These findings confirm the onomastic and linguistic evidence presented in 1993 by Geoffrey Hull, who traced the oldest Maltese surnames to southern and south-eastern Sicily, especially the Agrigento district.

The study of Capelli et al. 2015 clustered the male Maltese genetic markers with those of Sicilians and Calabrians, and showed a minuscule input from the Eastern Mediterranean.

Another study carried out by geneticists Spencer Wells and Pierre Zalloua et al. in 2008 claimed that more than 50% of Y-chromosomes from Maltese men could have Phoenician origins.

According to a 2013 study by Iosif Lazaridis et al., Maltese people are genetically distinct from Europeans and shifted towards the Middle East in a principal component analysis. The study concludes that the Maltese people "may have more Near Eastern ancestry than can be explained via EEF (Early European Farmer) admixture".

Culture

The culture of Malta is a reflection of various cultures that have come into contact with the Maltese Islands throughout the centuries, including neighbouring Mediterranean cultures, and the cultures of the nations that ruled Malta for long periods of time prior to its independence in 1964.

The culture of modern Malta has been described as a "rich pattern of traditions, beliefs and practices," which is the result of "a long process of adaptation, assimilation and cross fertilisation of beliefs and usages drawn from various conflicting sources."  It has been subjected to the same complex, historic processes that gave rise to the linguistic and ethnic admixture that defines who the people of Malta and Gozo are today.

Language

Maltese people speak the Maltese language, a unique hybrid vernacular basically Semitic but with an imposing Romance (Italian) superstratum, and written in the Latin alphabet in its standard form. The language is descended from Siculo-Arabic, an extinct dialect of Arabic that was spoken in Sicily by indigenous people who were at that time divided in religion into continuing Greek-rite Christians and Muslims whose recent ancestors were Sicilian converts from Christianity. In the course of Malta's history, the language has adopted massive amounts of vocabulary from Sicilian and Italian, to a much lesser degree, borrowings from English (anglicisms being more common in colloquial Maltese than in the literary language), and a few dozen French loanwords. A large number of superficially Arabic words and idioms are actually loan translations (calques) from Sicilian and Italian which would make little or no sense to speakers of other Arabic-derived languages.

Maltese became an official language of Malta in 1934, replacing Italian and joining English. There are an estimated 371,900 speakers in Malta of the language, with statistics citing that 100% of the people are able to speak Maltese, 88% English, 66% Italian and 17% French, showing a greater degree of linguistic capabilities than most other European countries. In fact multilingualism is a common phenomenon in Malta, with English, Maltese and on occasion Italian, used in everyday life. Whilst Maltese is the national language, it has been suggested that with the ascendancy of English a language shift may begin; though a survey dating to 2005 suggested that the percentage speaking Maltese as their mother tongue within Malta remained at 97%.

Religion

The Constitution of Malta provides for freedom of religion but establishes Roman Catholicism as the state religion. Malta is described in the Book of Acts ( and ) as the place where Paul the Apostle was shipwrecked on his way to Rome, awaiting trial. Freedom House and the World Factbook report that 98% of the Maltese are Catholic (mostly Roman-rite, with a Byzantine-rite minority), making the nation one of the most Catholic countries in the world.

Emigration 

Malta has long been a country of emigration, with big Maltese communities in English-speaking countries abroad as well as in France.
Mass emigration picked up in the 19th century, reaching its peak in the decades after World War II. Migration was initially to north African countries (particularly Algeria, Tunisia and Egypt); later Maltese migrants headed towards the United Kingdom, the United States, Canada and Australia. There is little trace left of the Franco-Maltese communities in north Africa, most of them having been displaced, after the rise of independence movements, to places like France (especially Marseille and the Riviera), the United Kingdom or Australia. The Franco-Maltese are culturally distinct from the Maltese from Malta, in that the former have remained attached to the use of the Italian language (often, but not always, alongside Maltese) as well as speaking French. Although migration has ceased to be a social phenomenon of significance there are still important Maltese communities in Australia, Canada, the United States and the United Kingdom. Emigration dropped dramatically after the mid-1970s and has since ceased to be a social phenomenon of significance. 
Since Malta joined the EU in 2004 expatriate communities emerged in a number of European countries particularly in Belgium and Luxembourg.

Notable Maltese Individuals 

The following is an incomplete list of Maltese people who are historically significant or of particular importance to Maltese people.

 Pietru Caxaro (c. 1400 - 1485) – philosopher, poet, author of Il-Kantilena (oldest known poem in the Maltese language).
 Toni Bajada (c. 16th century) – spy, folk hero, participant in the Great Siege of Malta in 1565.
 Ġlormu Cassar (c. 1520 - 1592) – architect, military engineer, involved in the construction of Valletta.
 Iacob Heraclid (c. 1527 - 1563) – soldier, usurper and despot of the Principality of Moldavia.
 Klement Tabone (c. 1575 - 1665) – member of the Maltese militia, land owner and participant in the Raid on Żejtun in 1614.
 Ġan Franġisk Abela (c. 1582 - 1655) – historian, author of Della Descrittione di Malta (1647).
 Lorenzo Gafà (c. 1639 - 1703) – Baroque architect and sculptor working in Hospitaller Malta.
 Melchiorre Gafà (c. 1636 - 1667) – Baroque sculptor working in Rome.
 Ġan Piet Franġisk Agius de Soldanis (c. 1712 - 1770) – linguist, historian, priest, author of the first Maltese language lexicon.
 Dun Mikiel Xerri (c. 1737 - 1799) – priest, Maltese patriot, participant in the Siege of Malta (1798–1800).
 Saverio Cassar (c. 1746 - 1805) – priest, Governor-General of de facto independent Gozo from 1798 to 1801.
 Emmanuele Vitale (c. 1758–1802) – general, commander of the Maltese irregular army in the Siege of Malta (1798–1800).
 Mikiel Anton Vassalli (c. 1764 - 1829) – philosopher, linguist, Maltese nationalist. Published the first Maltese dictionary in 1796.
 Juan Bautista Azopardo (c. 1772 - 1848) – privateer and colonel in the Argentine War of Independence.
 Manwel Dimech (c. 1860 - 1921) – teacher, socialist, journalist, writer, social reformer. Exiled to Egypt by the British in 1918.
 Temi Zammit (c. 1864 - 1935) – medical doctor, archaeologist, historian and writer. Excavated the Ħal Saflieni Hypogeum, Megalithic Temples of Malta and other sites. Discovered contaminated goat's milk as the vector for transmission to humans of Brucellosis melitensis in 1905.
 San Ġorġ Preca (c. 1880 - 1962) – priest, founder of the Society of Christian Doctrine, canonised as a saint by the Catholic Church in 2007.
 Pietru Pawl Saydon (c. 1895 - 1971) – priest, linguist, scholar of Semitic languages and Biblical studies, published the first Maltese translation of the Bible in 1959.
 Dom Mintoff (c. 1916 - 2012) – politician, socialist, architect, civil engineer. Prime Minister of Malta from 1955 to 1958, and from 1971 to 1984.
 Agatha Barbara (c. 1923 - 2002) – politician, first woman to become President of Malta (1982 - 1987) and longest-serving woman member in the Maltese parliament; from 1947 to 1982.
 Roberta Metsola (b. 1979) –  politician, President of the European Parliament, first Maltese person to hold office.

See also

 List of Maltese people
 Demographics of Malta
 Maltese Americans

Further reading
Society and inquisition in Malta 1743-1798

Notes

References
 Bonanno A. (2005). Malta: Phoenician, Punic and Roman. Midsea Books: Valletta.

External links

Joëlle Pawelczyk, "The Origin of the 'Maltese' Surnames"

 
Ethnic groups in Malta
Semitic-speaking peoples
People